KSUW (91.3 FM) is a radio station licensed to Sheridan, Wyoming, United States. The station is owned by the  University of Wyoming, and is an affiliate of Wyoming Public Radio (WPR), airing a format consisting of news, jazz, adult album alternative and classical music originating from KUWR in Laramie, Wyoming. The station's tower is located south of Sheridan near the town of Story.

External links
Wyoming Public Media

SUW
NPR member stations
SUW